The Belgian Women's Cup is the cup competition for women's football in Belgium. The Royal Belgian Football Association established the cup in 1977.

List of finals
The following is a list of all finals:

Most wins

See also
Football in Belgium

References

External links
Official website
Cup at women.soccerway.com

Belgium Women
Recurring sporting events established in 1977
Women's football competitions in Belgium